Matej Rodin (born 13 February 1996) is a Croatian professional footballer who plays as a centre-back for Belgian club Oostende.

Club career
On 19 June 2019, he moved to Italian Serie B club Perugia. He did not make any official game appearances for Perugia, and on 17 February 2020 he was sold to Croatian club Varaždin. 

On 11 September 2020, he joined the oldest existing Polish football club Cracovia.

On 2 January 2023, Rodin signed with Oostende in Belgium until 2026.

Honours

Club
Cracovia
 Polish Super Cup: 2020

References

External links
 
Matej Rodin at Sofascore

1996 births
Sportspeople from Metković
Living people
Croatian footballers
Association football central defenders
NK GOŠK Gabela players
NK Lokomotiva Zagreb players
HNK Šibenik players
NK Aluminij players
HŠK Zrinjski Mostar players
FK Željezničar Sarajevo players
A.C. Perugia Calcio players
NK Varaždin players
MKS Cracovia (football) players
K.V. Oostende players
Premier League of Bosnia and Herzegovina players
Croatian Football League players
First Football League (Croatia) players
Slovenian PrvaLiga players
Ekstraklasa players
Belgian Pro League players
Croatian expatriate footballers
Expatriate footballers in Bosnia and Herzegovina
Croatian expatriate sportspeople in Bosnia and Herzegovina
Expatriate footballers in Slovenia
Croatian expatriate sportspeople in Slovenia
Expatriate footballers in Italy
Croatian expatriate sportspeople in Italy
Expatriate footballers in Poland
Croatian expatriate sportspeople in Poland
Expatriate footballers in Belgium
Croatian expatriate sportspeople in Belgium